Bruce Block (born April 13, 1967 in St. Joseph, Michigan) is an entertainer, magician, actor, and ventriloquist.

Career
Block has appeared on America's Got Talent (seasons 2 and 3), The Tonight Show with Jay Leno and many more.  His expertise is appreciated even by his peers. Scott Wells reviewed Block's appearance at the Texas Association of Magicians 2003 conference by stating "Bruce Block was perhaps the highlight of the evening...", His humor and juggling never missed..." and "Very clever and quite memorable".  Bruce Block holds the world record for most cigar boxes balanced on his chin.

His special acts include: 
Escaping from a straitjacket
Lying on a bed of nails and having a lady jump on him
Ventriloquist act with his rabbit
Making his or someone else's head vanish
Juggling balls with his mouth
Making a miniature horse appear in a box
Balancing hundreds of cigar boxes on his chin

Recognition
In 2005, Bruce Block received the "Best of Las Vegas Award" from the Las Vegas Review-Journal.
February, 2005 - Bruce Block wins the $10,000 first prize on Steve Harvey's Big Time Challenge
In February 2005, Block's talking Rabbit "Skippy Ala King" made a surprise appearance at the Aspen Comedy Festival and was given the honor of "Best of the Festival".

References

External links

imdb.com, "The Great Magic of Las Vegas" (2005)
fancast.com, Bruce Block accepts a challenge from David Hasselhof on America's Got Talent
itricks.com, "America’s Got Talent: Is Magic On The Bubble?"

America's Got Talent contestants
American magicians
Living people
1967 births
Ventriloquists
People from St. Joseph, Michigan